Dmytro Zamotayev (Дмитро Замотаєв; born 4 April 1995) is a Ukrainian amateur boxer in the Light flyweight division.

He won a bronze medal at the 2015 European Games.

References

External links
 Profile at otamans.com

1995 births
Living people
Ukrainian male boxers
AIBA World Boxing Championships medalists
Boxers at the 2015 European Games
European Games bronze medalists for Ukraine
European Games medalists in boxing
Boxers at the 2019 European Games
Light-flyweight boxers
21st-century Ukrainian people